Jorge Alberto Comas Romero (born 9 June 1960) is an Argentine former footballer who played as a striker, and is an Olympian, having taken part at the 1988 Summer Olympics. He played for football clubs in Argentina and Mexico and also represented the Argentina national football team.

Club career
Comas (nicknamed "Comitas", a diminutive ) started his professional career with Colón de Santa Fe in 1980. After the club was relegated from the Primera División in 1981 he moved to Vélez Sársfield where he scored 54 goals in 166 games. He was the topscorer in 1985 Nacional championship with 12 goals.

In 1986 Comas joined Boca Juniors where he improved his goalscoring ratio, scoring 63 goals in 127 games in all competitions. Despite of having played only 4 years for the Xeneize, he was the 2nd topscorer of 1986–87 season with 19 goals. Comas formed a remembered attacking line with right-winger Alfredo Graciani and centre-forward Jorge Rinaldi.

In 1989 Comas joined Mexican side Veracruz, where he became a fan favourite after being the top scorer for the 1989–90 season. He played for the "Tiburones Rojos" until 1994 when he returned to Argentina and his first club; Colón de Santa Fe.

After retiring as a player Comas has become a striking coach with several Mexican clubs including Celaya, León, Cruz Azul and Veracruz.

International career

1988 Summer Olympic Games
He played on the Argentine team which took part at the 1988 Summer Olympic Games.

Personal life
His career in Mexico was documented by Duolingo to train Spanish speakers.

References

External links
 Interview with Clarín newspaper 
 Boca Juniors profile 
 

1960 births
Living people
Sportspeople from Entre Ríos Province
Argentine footballers
Association football forwards
Argentina international footballers
Olympic footballers of Argentina
Footballers at the 1988 Summer Olympics
Club Atlético Colón footballers
Club Atlético Vélez Sarsfield footballers
Boca Juniors footballers
C.D. Veracruz footballers
Argentine Primera División players
Liga MX players
Argentine expatriate footballers
Expatriate footballers in Mexico